Brian Tømming Hämäläinen (born 29 May 1989) is a Danish professional footballer who plays as a left-back for Danish Superliga club Lyngby Boldklub.

A former Denmark youth international, Hämäläinen made his breakthrough as part of Lyngby Boldklub before moving to Belgian Pro League club Zulte Waregem in 2011. After one season, he moved to Genk where he failed to establish himself as a starter. After four years, he returned to Zulte Waregem, before playing two years for Dynamo Dresden in the German 2. Bundesliga. He returned to Lyngby in 2020.

Career

Lyngby
Hämäläinen began playing in the youth department of Allerød FK from 1994. In 2003, he moved to the youth academy of Lyngby. On 20 August 2007, he made his debut in a 1–6 loss to Esbjerg fB, coming on as a substitute for Andreas Bjelland in the 82nd minute.

He impressed and grew into a starter at the club, reaching almost 100 matches in the top two Danish leagues. In May 2009, he went on trial with Lille but later declined an offer to sign with the French side.

Zulte Waregem
In July 2011, Hämäläinen was signed by Belgian Pro League club Zulte Waregem. He started all matches in his first season at Zulte, and made five more appearances for the club the following season.

Genk
In August 2012, Hämäläinen moved to Genk. In the 2013–14 season, he made four appearances in the UEFA Europa League – where Genk were eliminated in the round of 32 against VfB Stuttgart – and ten games in the league, in which his club finished third. Thereby, the club took part in the championship play-offs and finished fifth. There, Hämäläinen was used in four games. He made three appearances in the Belgian Cup, which Genk won. In the following season, Hämäläinen played in two games in the Belgian Cup and was eliminated with Genk in the quarter-finals, while in the UEFA Europa League the club reached the last sixteen.

At Genk, Hämäläinen appeared in only 31 league matches during his four-year spell there.

Return to Zulte Waregem
In June 2016, Hämäläinen returned to Zulte Waregem on a two-year contract. He made three appearances in the Belgian cup competition, in which the club were eliminated by Standard Liège, and 16 total appearances in the league.

In the 2016–17 season, Hämäläinen won his second Belgian Cup as part of Zulte Waregem, beating Oostende in the final.

Dynamo Dresden
Between 2018 and 2020 he played for German 2. Bundesliga club Dynamo Dresden.

Return to Lyngby
In September 2020, Hämäläinen returned to Lyngby BK on a deal until the summer 2022. In January 2021, he suffered a knee injury in practice; tests later confirmed that he had sustained ligament damage which would sideline him for an extended period of time. At the end of the season, Lyngby suffered relegation to the Danish 1st Division after a loss to last placed AC Horsens.

On 4 March 2022, Hämäläinen made his first appearance for Lyngby since returning from injury, coming off the bench in injury time for Adam Sørensen in a 3–0 away win over Fremad Amager. After the club had won promotion back to the Superliga, Hämäläinen signed a one-year contract extension, keeping him in Lyngby until 2023.

Personal life
Hämäläinen is of Finnish descent through his maternal great-grandfather. He was approached by Hasse Backe, coach of the Finland national team in 2016, but expressed that he did not consider himself Finnish.

Career statistics

Honours
Genk
Belgian Cup: 2012–13

Zulte Waregem
Belgian Cup: 2016–17

References

External links

1989 births
Living people
People from Allerød Municipality
Association football defenders
Danish men's footballers
Danish expatriate men's footballers
Denmark under-21 international footballers
Denmark youth international footballers
Danish people of Finnish descent
Allerød FK players
Lyngby Boldklub players
S.V. Zulte Waregem players
K.R.C. Genk players
Dynamo Dresden players
Danish Superliga players
Danish 1st Division players
Belgian Pro League players
2. Bundesliga players
Danish expatriate sportspeople in Belgium
Danish expatriate sportspeople in Germany
Expatriate footballers in Belgium
Expatriate footballers in Germany
Sportspeople from the Capital Region of Denmark